is a railway station in the city of  Noda, Chiba, Japan, operated by the private railway operator Tōbu Railway. The station is numbered "TD-16".

Lines

Station layout
Atago Station has two opposed side platforms connected by a footbridge. The station is scheduled to be rebuilt as an elevated station by fiscal 2023.

Platforms

Adjacent stations

History
Atago Station opened on September 1, 1929.

From 17 March 2012, station numbering was introduced on the Tobu Noda Line, with Atago Station becoming "TD-16".

Passenger statistics
In fiscal 2018, the station was used by an average of 9,900 passengers daily.

Surrounding area
Noda City Hall
Atago Jinja
Noda Cultural Center
Noda Post Office
Bujinkan Honbu Dojo

References

External links

  Tobu Railway station information 

Railway stations in Chiba Prefecture
Stations of Tobu Railway
Tobu Noda Line
Railway stations in Japan opened in 1929
Noda, Chiba